Raorchestes ghatei (common name: Ghate's shrub frog) is a species of shrub frogs from the Western Ghats of Maharashtra.

Overview 
The species differs from its congeners based on a combination of characters including small to medium-sized adult males, snout mucronate in dorsal view, canthus rostralis angular and sharp, snout slightly projecting beyond mouth ventrally, tympanum indistinct and one third of the eye diameter, tongue without papilla but with a lingual pit, nuptial pad rudimentary to absent, a bony tubercle on humerus at the end of deltoid ridge present in males and absent in females, skin finely granulated or smooth dorsally, lateral side marbled with white blotches on brown to black background. Molecular phylogeny based on 16S rRNA gene sequence suggests that the new species is genetically distinct and forms a monophyletic clade within Raorchestes. The species exhibits sexual dimorphism with males having single sub-gular vocal sac and a tubercle on the humerus while females lack them. The species shows direct development. The species is widely distributed in the Western Ghats of Maharashtra.

References

External links
 

ghatei
Taxa named by Neelesh Dahanukar
Amphibians described in 2013
Frogs of India
Endemic fauna of the Western Ghats